The Indragiri River is a river in Sumatra, in the Indonesian province of Riau, Indonesia, about 800 km northwest of the capital Jakarta. It is formed from the union of the Ombilin River and the Sinamar River, and empties into the Strait of Malacca. The middle part that flows in the Kuantan Singingi Regency is called Batang Kuantan (Kuantan River).

Geography
The river flows in the eastern area of Sumatra with predominantly tropical rainforest climate (designated as Af in the Köppen-Geiger climate classification). The annual average temperature in the area is 23 °C. The warmest month is February, when the average temperature is around 24 °C, and the coldest is August, at 22 °C. The average annual rainfall is 2757 mm. The wettest month is November, with an average of 345 mm rainfall, and the driest is January, with 107 mm rainfall.

See also
List of rivers of Indonesia
List of rivers of Sumatra

References

Rivers of Sumatra
Rivers of Riau
Rivers of Indonesia